Arfon is a constituency of the Senedd. It was created for the former Assembly's 2007 election. It elects one Member of the Senedd by the first past the post method of election. Also, however, it is one of nine constituencies in the North Wales electoral region, which elects four additional members, in addition to nine constituency members, to produce a degree of proportional representation for the region as a whole.

Boundaries

The constituency has the boundaries of the Arfon Westminster constituency, entirely within the preserved county of Gwynedd, which will come into use, also, for the 2010 United Kingdom general election. The new constituency merged areas currently within the Caernarfon constituency and the Conwy constituency. The Caernarfon constituency was entirely within the preserved county of Gwynedd. The Conwy constituency was partly a Gwynedd constituency and partly within the preserved county of Clwyd.

The North Wales region was created for the first Assembly election, in 1999. For the 2007 election, however, it had new boundaries. It includes the constituencies of Aberconwy, Alyn and Deeside, Arfon, Clwyd South, Clwyd West, Delyn, Vale of Clwyd, Wrexham and Ynys Môn.

Voting
In general elections for the Senedd, each voter has two votes. The first vote may be used to vote for a candidate to become the Member of the Senedd for the voter's constituency, elected by the first past the post system. The second vote may be used to vote for a regional closed party list of candidates. Additional member seats are allocated from the lists by the d'Hondt method, with constituency results being taken into account in the allocation.

Assembly Members and Members of the Senedd

Elections

Elections in the 2020s

Elections in the 2010s

Regional ballots rejected: 139

Elections in the 2000s

References

Senedd constituencies in the North Wales electoral region
2007 establishments in Wales
Constituencies established in 2007